Krazy Ivan is a mecha first-person shooter released for PC, Sega Saturn and PlayStation in 1996 by Psygnosis.

The player takes the role of Ivan Popovich, a Russian soldier controlling a giant mechanical suit, defending the Earth from robotic aliens. The game consists of five zones: Russia, Saudi Arabia, France, USA and Japan. The game has an interface at the end of each zone allowing the player to spend the game's form of experience points (power cores) on upgrades and weapons.

The game uses full motion video for its intro movie and a cut-scene between each level. The in-game soundtrack was written and produced by Mike Clarke and Tim Wright.

Development
The live action cutscenes were all filmed using the blue screen technique.

Release
Despite being demonstrated at a Sega of America games exhibition in 1996 and reviewed in the major North American gaming magazines of the time, the Saturn version of Krazy Ivan was never released in North America. The North American reviews for the Saturn version ranged from middling to outright negative. THQ planned to release the Sega Saturn version of the game in the US, but later withdrew support for the system due to its dwindling presence in the market.

Reception

Krazy Ivan received generally mixed reviews. Air Hendrix gave the PlayStation version a mixed review in GamePro, saying the gameplay is repetitive and requires little strategy but demands fast reflexes, the controls are tight but conspicuously lack the ability to jump, and the graphics are detailed but suffer from slowdown. He concluded that "Krazy Ivan has some problems, but it stands tall above its Saturn counterpart, Ghen War." Electronic Gaming Monthly called it the first great mech game for the console and praised the graphics, the cinematics, the controls, and the close guidance through mission objectives, but they criticized the lack of replay value. A Next Generation critic praised the animation, heavy use of distance fog, PlayStation Link Cable support, and FMV sequences which "range from painless to humorous." However, he criticized that the levels, despite being set all around the world, all look the same, and that the game can be beaten in just a few hours. Maximum summarized that Krazy Ivan "is far too limited and, in all honesty, suffers from the perennial problem of presentation over playability." They specifically found that the game offers no motivation for the player to not simply head straight to the boss of each stage and defeat it using the simple strategy of firing while strafing.

Next Generation reviewed the Saturn version of the game and stated that "The gameplay [...] is still as sharp as ever, making this a respectable but unexciting game for the Saturn library." Paul Glancey of Sega Saturn Magazine praised the graphics and premise, but criticized the gameplay as being shallow and overly easy, with the simple strategy of sidestepping and firing working in most situations.

Reviewing the PC version, GameSpot echoed Sega Saturn Magazine by praising the graphics and premise but ultimately dismissing the game for going no deeper than a sidestep-and-fire strategy.

References

1996 video games
Fictional Russian people in video games
Fictional Russian military personnel
First-person shooters
Video games about mecha
PlayStation (console) games
Sega Saturn games
Video games set in the 2010s
Video games set in France
Video games set in Japan
Video games set in Russia
Video games set in Saudi Arabia
Video games set in the United States
Windows games
Video games scored by Tim Wright (Welsh musician)
Psygnosis games
Video games developed in the United Kingdom